Dhakirgaon is a village of Matlab Dakshin Upazila in Chandpur District in the Division of Chittagong, Bangladesh.

Geography
It has a total land area of 0.92 km2.

Education

Dhakirgaon Government Primary School is a notable primary school.

See also
Villages of Bangladesh
Upazilas of Bangladesh
Districts of Bangladesh
Divisions of Bangladesh

References

Upazilas of Chandpur District